Wipro Limited (formerly, Western India Palm Refined Oils Limited) is an Indian multinational corporation that provides information technology, consulting and business process services. Thierry Delaporte is serving as CEO and managing director of Wipro since July 2020.

Wipro's capabilities range across cloud computing, cyber security, digital transformation, artificial intelligence, robotics, data analytics, and other technology consulting services to customers in 167 countries.

History of Wipro

Early years

The company was incorporated on 29 December 1945 in Amalner, India, by Mohamed Premji as Western India Vegetable Products Limited, later abbreviated to Wipro. It was initially set up as a manufacturer of vegetable and refined oils under the trade names of Kisan, Sunflower, and Camel.

In 1966, after Mohamed Premji's death, his son Azim Premji took over Wipro as its chairman at the age of 21.

Shift to IT Industry
During the 1970s and 1980s, the company shifted its focus to new opportunities in the IT and computing industry, which was at a nascent stage in India at the time. On 7 June 1977, the name of the company changed from Western India Vegetable Products Limited, to Wipro Products Limited. In 1982, the name was changed again, from Wipro Products Limited to Wipro Limited. In 1999, Wipro was listed on the New York Stock Exchange. In 2004, Wipro became the second Indian IT company to earn US$1 billion in annual revenue.

In 2012, Wipro demerged its non-IT businesses into a separate company called Wipro Enterprises. Prior to this demerger, these businesses, mainly in the consumer care, lighting, furniture, hydraulics, water treatment, and medical diagnostics, contributed about 10% of Wipro's total revenues.

In August 2018, Wipro paid US$75m to National Grid US as a settlement for a botched SAP implementation that an 2014 audit estimated could cost the company US$1 billion. Wipro had been hired as systems integrator in 2010, but errors in the rollout, intended to replace an Oracle system, caused serious losses and reputational damage.

In March 2020, Hedera announced that Wipro would be joining their Governing Council, providing decentralized governance to its hashgraph distributed ledger technology.

In March 2023, Wipro opened its American international headquarters at Tower Center in East Brunswick, Middlesex County, New Jersey.

Notable acquisitions 
In 2006, Wipro acquired California-based technology company cMango in an all cash deal.

In 2012, Wipro acquired Australian analytics company, Promax Applications Group for A$35 million in an all cash deal.

In 2015, Wipro acquired Denmark-based design consultancy Designit for €85 million.

In 2016, Wipro acquired cloud services consultancy Appirio for $500M.

In April 2019, Wipro acquired Filipino personal care company Splash Corporation.

In February 2020, Wipro acquired Rational Interaction, a Seattle-based digital customer experience consultancy.

In March 2021, Wipro acquired Capco, a 22-year-old global technology and management consultancy specializing in driving digital transformation in the financial services industry.
The deal was completed in April.

Wipro has signed an agreement to acquire Ampion for a cash consideration of $117 million, according to an exchange filing.

In December 2021, Wipro signed a definitive agreement to acquire LeanSwift, a system integrator of Infor products for customers across the Americas and Europe. The acquisition is subject to customary closing conditions and is expected to close before the end of the quarter ending March 31, 2022, Wipro stated in a BSE filing.

In April 2022, Wipro signed a definitive agreement to acquire the Stamford, Connecticut-headquartered Systems Applications and Products (SAP) consulting company, Rizing Intermediate Holdings.

Sustainability
Wipro has committed to achieving net-zero emissions by 2040, with an intermittent goal of reducing emissions 55% by 2030. In October 2021, Wipro's Net Zero plans were certified by the Science-based Targets Initiative.

Listing and shareholding
Listing: Wipro's initial public offering was in 1946. Wipro's equity shares are listed on Bombay Stock Exchange, where it is a constituent of the BSE SENSEX index, and the National Stock Exchange of India where it is a constituent of the S&P CNX Nifty. The American Depositary Shares of the company are listed on the New York Stock Exchange (NYSE) since October 2000.

Shareholding: The table provides the share holding pattern as of 31 March 2022.

Employees
On 6 July 2020, Thierry Delaporte took over from Abidali Neemuchwala as the new CEO of Wipro. Abidali Neemuchwala was appointed as Wipro's CEO after T. K. Kurien stepped down in early 2016. Neemuchwala, who had been group president and CEO from April 2015, was appointed CEO with effect from 1 February 2016. In 2022, Wipro fired 300 employees who were moonlighting for competitors.

Awards and recognitions
 Wipro received the National award for excellence in Corporate Governance from the Institute of Company Secretaries of India during the year 2004.
 Wipro honored as 2010 Microsoft Country Partner of the Year Award for India.
 Wipro received the 'NASSCOM Corporate Award for Excellence in Diversity and Inclusion, 2012', in the category 'Most Effective Implementation of Practices & Technology for Persons with Disabilities'.
 Wipro was ranked second in the Newsweek 2012 Global 500 Green companies.
 In 2014, Wipro was ranked 52nd among India's most trusted brands according to the Brand Trust Report, a study conducted by Trust Research Advisory.
 Wipro won seven awards, including Best Managed IT Services and Best System Integrator in the CIO Choice Awards 2015, India
 Wipro won Gold Award for ‘Integrated Security Assurance Service (iSAS)’ under the ‘Vulnerability Assessment, Remediation and Management’ category of the 11th Annual 2015 Info Security PG's Global Excellence Awards.
 In May 2016, it was ranked 755th on the Forbes Global 2000 list.
 In March 2017, Wipro was recognized as one of the world's most ethical companies by US-based Ethisphere Institute for the sixth consecutive year.
 In 2018, Wipro received ATD's Best of the BEST Award.
 In 2021 Wipro awarded boomi worldwide spotlight award

See also

 List of public listed software companies of India
 List of IT consulting firms
 List of IT companies in India
 List of companies of India

References

External links

 
 

 
Consulting firms established in 1945
Business services companies established in 1945
Conglomerate companies established in 1945
Software companies of India
Outsourcing companies
Personal care companies
Business process outsourcing companies of India
Companies based in Bangalore
International information technology consulting firms
Information technology consulting firms of India
NIFTY 50
Business process outsourcing companies
Outsourcing in India
Computer companies of India
Information technology companies of Bhubaneswar
Indian brands
Indian companies established in 1945
Companies based in Karnataka
Companies listed on the National Stock Exchange of India
Companies listed on the Bombay Stock Exchange
Companies listed on the New York Stock Exchange